Ruth Plumly Thompson (27 July 1891 – 6 April 1976) was an American writer of children's stories, best known for writing many novels placed in Oz, the fictional land of L. Frank Baum's classic children's novel The Wonderful Wizard of Oz and its sequels.

Life and work

An avid reader of Baum's books and a lifelong children's writer, Thompson was born in Philadelphia, Pennsylvania. While in high school she sold her first fairy tale to St. Nicholas Magazine to which she continued contributing, along with The Smart Set. In 1914 she took a job with the Philadelphia Public Ledger,  writing a weekly children's column for the newspaper. She had already published her first children's book, The Perhappsy Chaps, and her second, The Princess of Cozytown, was pending publication when William Lee, vice president of Baum's publisher Reilly & Lee, solicited Thompson  to continue the Oz series. (Rumors among fans that Thompson was Baum's niece were untrue.) Between 1921 and 1939, she wrote one Oz book a year. (Since Thompson was the primary supporter of her widowed mother and disabled sister, the annual income from the Oz books was important for her financial circumstances.)

Thompson's contributions to the Oz series are lively and imaginative, featuring a wide range of colorful and unusual characters. She emphasized humor to a greater extent than Baum did and more specifically targeted children as her primary audience.

Illustrator John R. Neill wrote her on completing the illustrations for Kabumpo in Oz, "Incidentally, I would like to tell you how much I enjoyed reading the [manuscript] and making the pictures. After illustrating about seventeen Oz books, I think it worthwhile to let you know this with my congratulations on having secured an author of such superior qualifications to continue the work of supplying the 'Oz books.' Every feature of the child appeal is handled with the greatest skill. The whimsical, the humor, the interest and the zip of the book make me think it one of the very best Oz books so far."

After a falling out with the Oz Publisher in the 1930s she did articles for Jack and Jill, Saturday Evening Post and Ladies Home Journal.

In addition she was the initial editor of Ace Comics, King Comics and later became also editor of Magic Comics, all for David McKay Publications. In some cases she used the pen name Jo King. Her friend Marge provided illustrations for many of the pieces she contributed. 1965-1970 for Jack and Jill she did the Perky Puppet page.

Returning to Oz after many years her last two books were published by The International Wizard of Oz Club: Yankee in Oz (1972) and The Enchanted Island of Oz (1976); the latter was not originally written as an Oz book.

Oz books by Thompson

 1921: The Royal Book of Oz
 1922: Kabumpo in Oz
 1923: The Cowardly Lion of Oz
 1924: Grampa in Oz
 1925: The Lost King of Oz
 1926: The Hungry Tiger of Oz
 1927: The Gnome King of Oz
 1928: The Giant Horse of Oz
 1929: Jack Pumpkinhead of Oz
 1930: The Yellow Knight of Oz
 1931: Pirates in Oz
 1932: The Purple Prince of Oz
 1933: Ojo in Oz
 1934: Speedy in Oz
 1935: The Wishing Horse of Oz
 1936: Captain Salt in Oz
 1937: Handy Mandy in Oz
 1938: The Silver Princess in Oz
 1939: Ozoplaning with the Wizard of Oz
 1972: Yankee in Oz
 1976: The Enchanted Island of Oz

A short collection of Thompson's Oz poetry, The Cheerful Citizens of Oz, was published in 1992.

Non-Oz books by Thompson
 The Perhappsy Chaps, P.F. Volland Co. (1918)
 The Princess of Cozytown, P.F. Volland Co. (1922)
 The Curious Cruise of Captain Santa, Reilly & Lee (1926)
 The Wonder Book, Reilly & Lee (1929)
 King Kojo, illustrated by Marge, Donald MacKay (1938)
 The Wizard of Way-Up and Other Wonders, The International Wizard of Oz Club (1985), edited by James E. Haff and Douglas G. Greene
 Sissajig and Other Surprises, The International Wizard of Oz Club (2003), edited by Ruth Berman and Douglas G. Greene

See also 

 Children's literature

References

External links

 
 
 
 
 On Thompson's The Curious Cruise of Captain Santa

1891 births
1976 deaths
20th-century American novelists
20th-century American women writers
American children's writers
American fantasy writers
American women children's writers
American women novelists
Novelists from Pennsylvania
Oz (franchise)
Women science fiction and fantasy writers
Writers from Philadelphia